I'll See You in My Dreams is a 2003 Portuguese short horror film directed by Miguel Ángel Vivas, written and produced by Filipe Melo.

Plot 
The film is set in a small rural town that is haunted by the undead. Only one man seems to be able to stop them, and that is Lúcio, a worker whose wife recently turned into a zombie, forcing him to keep her locked in the basement. In a local tavern he finds a second shot at true love, but this blooming romance is threatened by the situation plaguing the town.

Production
It was produced by a crew of musicians, filmmakers and actors who call themselves O Pato Profissional Produções. It was hailed as the first Portuguese zombie movie.

Soundtrack
Portuguese metal band Moonspell recorded a song for this movie, also titled "I'll See You in My Dreams," originally written by Isham Jones, with lyrics by Gus Kahn. Upon completion of the movie, the cast and crew volunteered to stay longer, and shoot a promotional music video based on this song.

References

External links
 

2003 horror films
Portuguese horror films
2000s Portuguese-language films
2003 short films
Zombie short films
Portuguese short films
2003 films
Films directed by Miguel Ángel Vivas